Narsimhulapet is a village and Mandal headquarter in Mahabubabad district (also called as Manukota) of the state of Telangana, India. Narsimhulapet is named after a famous temple of Sri Lakshmi Narasimha Swamy built during the Kakatiya dynasty. Narsimhulapet is part of Dornakal constituency in Telangana Legislative Assembly.

Geography 

Narsimhulapet is located 5 kilometers from the Warangal Khammam highway. 28 Kilometers away from Mahabubabad and 25 Kilometers away from Thorrur.

Panchayats 

Agapeta
Beerishettigudem
Bojjannapeta
Danthalapalle
Datla
Erralachaiahgudem
Gundamrajupalli
Gunnepalle
Jayapuram
Kommulavancha
Kowsalyadevipalle
Kummarikuntla
Mungimadugu
Narsimhulapet
Padamatigudem
Peddamupparam
Peddanagaram
Ramannagudem
Ramanujapuram
Reponi
Vanthadupula
Vemulapally

Temples 

Sri Venkateshwara Swamy Temple
Sri Lakshmi Narasimha Swamy Temple
Lord Shiva Temple
Tirupathamma Thalli Temple

References 

Villages in Mahabubabad district
Mandal headquarters of Telangana